Tobolsky (masculine), Tobolskaya (feminine), Tobolskoye (neuter), or Tobolskiye (plural) may refer to:
Tobolsky District, a district of Tyumen Oblast, Russia
Tobolsky (rural locality), a rural locality (a settlement) in Svetlinsky District of Orenburg Oblast, Russia
Tobolskaya, a rural locality (a village) in Karagaysky District of Perm Krai, Russia
Tobolskiye, a rural locality (a village) in Orlovsky District of Kirov Oblast, Russia